Yakushev is a Russian masculine surname, its feminine counterpart is Yakusheva. It may refer to:

 Alexander Yakushev (born 1947), Soviet ice hockey player
 Anatoli Yakushev (born 1980), Russian footballer
 Marina Yakusheva (born 1974), Russian badminton player 
 Viktor Yakushev (1937–2001), Soviet ice hockey player
 Vladimir Yakushev (born 1968), Russian politician
 Vladimir Anatolyevich Yakushev (born 1970), Russian naval officer

Russian-language surnames